The East Main Street Bridge in Corbin, Kentucky, spanning Lynn Camp Creek between Knox County, Kentucky and Whitley County, Kentucky, was built in 1890.  Also known as the Engineers Street Bridge, it was listed on the National Register of Historic Places in 1986.

It is a Pratt truss through truss bridge built by the Louisville Bridge Co.  It brings Engineers St. (formerly E. Main St.) across Lynn Camp Creek in Corbin.

It was an old bridge of the Louisville and Nashville Railroad which was offered to the city in 1902. They donated the railroad bridge which was moved into place in 1905 as a road bridge, which was later converted to a pedestrian bridge.

References

Pratt truss bridges in the United States
Bridges on the National Register of Historic Places in Kentucky
National Register of Historic Places in Knox County, Kentucky
National Register of Historic Places in Whitley County, Kentucky
Bridges completed in 1890
Corbin, Kentucky
Transportation in Whitley County, Kentucky
Transportation in Knox County, Kentucky
1890 establishments in Kentucky
Relocated buildings and structures in Kentucky
Pedestrian bridges in Kentucky
Louisville and Nashville Railroad
Rail trail bridges in the United States